The following is a list of episodes for the Canadian animated television series Storm Hawks.

Series overview
{|class="wikitable plainrowheaders" style="text-align:center;"
|-
!colspan="2" rowspan="2"|Season
!rowspan="2"|Episodes
!colspan="2"|Originally aired
|-
!First aired
!Last aired
|-
|style="background: #50A6C2;"|
|[[List of Storm Hawks episodes#Season 1: 2007|1]]
|26
|
|
|-
|style="background: #AE1D1D;"|
|[[List of Storm Hawks episodes#Season 2: 2008–2009|2]]
|26
|
|
|}

Episodes

Season 1: 2007

Season 2: 2008–2009

Storm Hawks